Aechmea fraseri is a plant species in the genus Aechmea. This species is native to Ecuador and Peru.

References

fraseri
Flora of Ecuador
Flora of Peru
Plants described in 1889